Michael Kenny (1925 – January 2003) was an Irish former sportsperson. He played hurling with his local club Graigue–Ballycallan and was a member of the Kilkenny senior inter-county team in the 1950s. With Kilkenny Walsh won an All-Ireland title and two Leinster titles.

References

1925 births
2003 deaths
Graigue-Ballycallan hurlers
Kilkenny inter-county hurlers
All-Ireland Senior Hurling Championship winners